Obadiah ( – ʿŌḇaḏyā or  – ʿŌḇaḏyāhū; "servant of Yah", or "Slave of Yah [YHVH]"), also known as Abdias, is a biblical prophet. The authorship of the Book of Obadiah is traditionally attributed to the prophet Obadiah.

Biblical account

Dating 
The Interpreters' Bible states that:

Rabbinic tradition 

According to the Talmud, Obadiah is said to have been a convert to Judaism from Edom, a descendant of Eliphaz, the friend of Job. He is identified with the Obadiah who was the servant of Ahab, and was chosen to prophesy against Edom because he was himself an Edomite.

Obadiah is supposed to have received the gift of prophecy for having hidden the "hundred prophets"  from the persecution of Jezebel. He hid the prophets in two caves, so that if those in one cave should be discovered those in the other might yet escape.

Obadiah was very rich, but all his wealth was expended in feeding the poor prophets, until, in order to be able to continue to support them, finally he had to borrow money at interest from Ahab's son Jehoram. Obadiah's fear of God was one degree higher than that of Abraham; and if the house of Ahab had been capable of being blessed, it would have been blessed for Obadiah's sake.

Christian tradition 
In some Christian traditions he is said to have been born in "Sychem" (Shechem), and to have been the third captain sent out by Ahaziah against Elijah. The date of his ministry is unclear due to certain historical ambiguities in the book bearing his name, but is believed to be around 586 B.C.

He is regarded as a saint by several Eastern churches. His feast day is celebrated on the 15th day of the Coptic Month Tobi (January 23/24) in the Coptic Orthodox Church. The Eastern Orthodox Church and those Eastern Catholic Churches which follow the Byzantine Rite celebrate his memory on November 19. (For those churches which follow the traditional Julian Calendar, November 19 currently falls on December 2 of the modern Gregorian Calendar.)

He is celebrated on February 28 in the Syriac and Malankara Churches, and with the other Minor prophets in the Calendar of saints of the Armenian Apostolic Church on July 31.

According to an old tradition, Obadiah is buried in Sebastia, at the same site as Elisha and where later the body of John the Baptist was believed to have been buried by his followers.

Islamic tradition 
Some Islamic scholars identify the prophet Dhu al-Kifl with Obadiah.

See also 
 Abdiel
 Theodulus, a Greek name with the same meaning

References

Citations

Sources 
 Book
 Holweck, F. G., A Biographical Dictionary of the Saints. St. Louis, MO: B. Herder Book Co., 1924.

External links
Prophet Obadiah (Abdias) Orthodox icon and synaxarion

6th-century BCE Jews
Christian saints from the Old Testament
Converts to Judaism from paganism
Book of Obadiah